The Barnsley Association League was a football competition for clubs in the Barnsley area of England.

History
It was founded as the Barnsley Minor Cup League in 1894, changing name to the Association League in 1909. The competition folded in 2005.

Honours

References

 
Defunct football leagues in England
Defunct football competitions in South Yorkshire
1894 establishments in England
Sports leagues established in 1894
2005 disestablishments in England
Sports leagues disestablished in 2005